Arnold is an unincorporated community located in the town of Ruby, Chippewa County, Wisconsin, United States.

After originally being called Still Hawn for two local businessmen, a post office called Arnold was established in 1905, and remained in operation until it was discontinued in 1934. The community was named for Arnold Deuel, the postmaster's son.

Notes

Unincorporated communities in Chippewa County, Wisconsin
Unincorporated communities in Wisconsin